Myriopteris lendigera is a species of cheilanthoid fern with the common name nit-bearing lip fern.

Description
Myriopteris lendigera grows from long creeping rhizomes 1–3 mm in diameter with dark brown scales. Leaves can be scattered or clustered and range in length from 5 to 30 cm. The petiole is usually dark brown. The leaf blade is ovate-deltate to oblong-lanceolate and usually 4-pinnate (subdivided 3 times) at the leaf base. The ultimate leaflet segments are round to slightly oblong and appear beadlike, with a diameter of 1–3 mm. Their abaxial (lower) surface is sparsely to moderately pubescent with coarse hairs and the adaxial (upper) surface is glabrous. Each leaflet curls under at the edge to form a false indusim. The spore-bearing sori are usually continuous around segment margins.

Range and habitat
Myriopteris lendigera is native to mountains in central and northern Mexico, Central America, Arizona and Texas in the United States, and extends into northeastern South American.

Taxonomy

References

lendigera